Edward H. "Ed" Morrell (October 22, 1868 – November 10, 1946) was an American convict, activist and a writer.

Biography
Morrell was an American prisoner who became known for withstanding cruelty and torture. He was accomplice to the Evans and Sontag gang that robbed the Southern Pacific Railroad in California's San Joaquin Valley in the 1890s. According to his memoir, "The 25th Man", the robberies were after revenge for the large railroad corporation's mistreatment of local ranchers of the San Joaquin Valley. Morrell was sentenced to life imprisonment in Folsom State Prison in 1894. He was eventually transferred to San Quentin (1899 at the latest), and pardoned in 1908. Five of his years were spent in solitary confinement; he was known as the Dungeon Man of San Quentin. Author Jack London championed his pardon and Morrell became a frequent guest at London's Beauty Ranch in Glen Ellen, California. London used Morrell as a character in his 1915 novel The Star Rover.

Morrell had been subjected to severe physical abuse in prison. After his release, he lectured widely on his experiences and advocated prison reform. He lectured with former San Quentin prisoner and author Donald Lowrie. Morrell's lectures included addresses to the California and Pennsylvania legislatures. He advocated the abolition of corporal punishment. In 1914, he wrote a one-act play, The Incorrigible, based on his experiences (and one of his nicknames). In 1924, he published his memoirs, The 25th Man: The Strange Story of Ed. Morrell, the Hero of Jack London's Star Rover.

Morrell was born in Thomaston, Pennsylvania on October 22, 1868. He came to California in 1891. "In his later years, he was a colorful habitue of Gower Gulch and a frequenter of Hollywood and Vine, the crony and pet of Hollywood film people." He died, age 78, in Los Angeles on November 10, 1946.

Selected publications
The Twenty-Fifth Man (1925)

See also
Battle of Stone Corral

References

External links
The Twenty-Fifth Man - biography

1868 births
1946 deaths
1894 crimes in the United States
Criminals from California
Criminals from Pennsylvania
People from Schuylkill County, Pennsylvania
Outlaws of the American Old West
Prisoners and detainees of California